Monika Jarosińska (born 28 May 1974 in Będzin) is a Polish actress and singer.

Filmography 
2003: Tak czy nie?
2003: Show
2004: Park tysiąca westchnień
2007: Dwie strony medalu

External links 
 
 Monika Jarosińska at filmpolski.pl

Polish television actresses
1974 births
Living people